ACS, Actividades de Construcción y Servicios, S.A. is a Spanish company dedicated to civil and engineering construction, all types services and telecommunications. It is one of the leading construction companies in the world, with projects in many countries around the world. The company was founded in 1997 through the merger of OCP Construcciones, S.A. and Ginés Navarro Construcciones, S.A. The group has a presence in Germany, India, Brazil, Chile, Morocco and Australia. The headquarters are in Madrid and the chairman is Florentino Pérez. Listed on the Bolsa de Madrid, the company's shares form part of the IBEX 35 stock market index.

History
The company was formed when a team of engineers acquired Construcciones Padrós S.A., a construction business which had been in financial difficulty, in 1983. The company acquired a majority holding in Cobra, a support services business, and merged with OCISA S.A. to create OCP Construcciones, S.A. in 1993; it went on to merge with Ginés Navarro Construcciones, S.A. to create Grupo ACS in 1997. It subsequently bought Onyx SCL, an environmental contractor, in 1999 and stakes in Xfera and Broadnet, telecommunications businesses, in 2000 before going on to acquire Dragados S.A., a large contractor established during World War II to dredge the Port of Tarifa and which had subsequently gained extensive experience in hydro-electric and civil engineering work, in 2003.

In 2006 the company acquired 22.0% of Unión Fenosa (raised later to 45%), a leading utilities business, before divesting it to Gas Natural in 2008, and in 2011, Grupo ACS raised its stake in Hochtief to 50.16%, effectively acquiring the company.

Divisions

Construction
Dragados
Pulice
John Picone
Schiavone
Prince Contracting
J.F. White
VYCSA
Roura & Cevasa
Electren
Constru-Rail
Edileuropa Di Stivaletti Michele
TECSA
Drace
Dravosa
GEOCISA
COGESA
Dycvensa
Dycasa
Pol-Aqua
Hochtief (66.5%)
Turner
Clark Builders
Flatiron
E.E. Cruz and Company
 CIMIC Group
CPB Contractors
Leighton Asia
Thiess
Ventia
UGL Limited

Infrastructure
Iridium

Industrial companies
Grupo Cobra
Grupo Etra
Etra air
SEMI S.A.
IMESAPI
EYRA
CYMI
Dragados OFFSHORE
GRUPO MAESSA
Maetel
Grupo MAESSA Arabia Saudi Ltd
Intecsa Industrial
Initec Energía
SICE

Services
Clece
Dragados SPL
Continental-Rail

Minority Investments
Abertis (25%)
Urbis

Significant projects
Major projects involving the company have included the Alqueva Dam completed in 2002, the Palau de les Arts Reina Sofia completed in 2005, the Torre Agbar completed in 2005, the Torre de Cristal completed in 2008, the Torre Caja Madrid completed in 2008, the LGV Perpignan–Figueres High Speed railway completed in 2009, the Portugués Dam in Ponce, Puerto Rico completed in 2014 and the Crescent Dunes Solar Energy Project completed in 2016.

References

External links

Public utilities of Spain
Energy companies of Spain
Telecommunications companies of Spain
Construction and civil engineering companies of Spain
Conglomerate companies of Spain
Multinational companies headquartered in Spain
Companies based in Madrid
Companies based in the Community of Madrid
Construction and civil engineering companies established in 1997
Energy companies established in 1997
Non-renewable resource companies established in 1997
Telecommunications companies established in 1997
IBEX 35
Companies listed on the Madrid Stock Exchange
Spanish companies established in 1997